Adriano Garib (born 31 January 1965) is a Brazilian actor, journalist and songwriter.

Selected television
Salsa e Merengue (1996–97)
A Lua Me Disse (2005)
Duas Caras (2007–08)
Insensato Coração (2011)
Vidas em Jogo (2011–12)
Salve Jorge (2012–13)
Magnifica 70 (2015–16)
1 Contra Todos (2016)
Good Morning, Verônica (2020–)

Selected filmography
Elite Squad: The Enemy Within (2010) - Guaracy
Getúlio (2014)

References

External links

Living people
Brazilian male film actors
Brazilian male television actors
1965 births